This is a list of rural localities in Novgorod Oblast. Novgorod Oblast (Novgorodskaya oblast) is a federal subject of Russia (an oblast). Its administrative center is the city of Veliky Novgorod. Some of the oldest Russian cities, including Veliky Novgorod and Staraya Russa, are located in the oblast. The historic monuments of Veliky Novgorod and surroundings have been declared a UNESCO World Heritage Site. Population: 634,111 (2010 Census).

Locations 
 Abramkovo
 Abrosovo
 Batetsky
 Dubishki
 Kosovo
 Maryovo
 Moshenskoye
 Poddorye
 Semytino
 Star
 Terebutenets
 Volot
 Yazhelbitsy

See also 
 
 Lists of rural localities in Russia

References 

Novgorod Oblast